Eretris is a Neotropical butterfly genus in the family Nymphalidae. The genus was erected by Theodor Otto Thieme in 1905.

Species
Eretris apuleina Pyrcz, 2004
Eretris apuleja (C. Felder & R. Felder, 1867)
Eretris calisto (C. Felder & R. Felder, [1867])
Eretris centralis Krüger, 1924
Eretris decorata (C. Felder & R. Felder, 1867)
Eretris depresissima Pyrcz, 1999
Eretris encycla (C. Felder & R. Felder, 1867)
Eretris hulda (Butler & H. Druce, 1872)
Eretris lecromi Pyrcz, 1999
Eretris maria (Schaus, 1920)
Eretris mendoza Pyrcz, 2004
Eretris ocellifera (C. Felder & R. Felder, 1867)
Eretris oculata (C. Felder & R. Felder, [1867])
Eretris porphyria (C. Felder & R. Felder, [1867])
Eretris subpunctata (Grose-Smith & Kirby, 1895)
Eretris subrufescens (Grose-Smith & Kirby, 1895)
Eretris suzannae DeVries, 1980
Eretris truncatina Pyrcz, 2004

References

Satyrinae
Nymphalidae of South America
Nymphalidae genera
Taxa named by Theodor Otto Thieme